Mogra (also spelt Magra) is a village in West Bengal, India.

Mogra may also refer to:

Mogra Badshahpur, a city and a municipal board in Jaunpur district in Uttar Pradesh, India
 Jasminum sambac, a flower, commonly known as Mogra in North India
 Ibrahim Mogra (born 1965), a British imam